A chronological listing of songs produced by will.i.am.

1998

Black Eyed Peas - Behind the Front 
 "Fallin' Up"
 "Clap Your Hands"
 "Joints & Jam"
 "The Way U Make Me Feel" (featuring Kim Hill)
 "Movement"
 "Karma"
 "Be Free" (featuring Kim Hill)
 "Say Goodbye"
 "Duet" (featuring Redfoo)
 "Communication"
 "What It Is" (featuring Kim Hill)
 "¿Que Dices?"
 "A8"
 "Love Won't Wait" (featuring Macy Gray)
 "Head Bobs"
 "Positivity"

2000

Black Eyed Peas - Bridging the Gap 
 "Weekends" (feat. Esthero)
 "Get Original" (feat. Chali 2na)
 "Cali to New York" (feat. De La Soul)
 "Lil' Lil'"
 "On My Own" (feat. Les Nubians and Mos Def)
 "Go Go"
 "Bringing It Back"
 "Tell Your Mama Come"
 "Request + Line" (feat. Macy Gray)

2001

will.i.am - Lost Change 
 "Ev Rebahdee" (feat. Planet Asia)
 "Lay Me Down" (feat. Terry Dexter)
 "Possessions"
 "Tai Arrive"
 "If You Didn't Know" (feat. Mykill Miers)
 "Money" (feat. The Horn Dogs, Huck Fynn and Oezlem)
 "Lost Change"
 "I Am"
 "Hooda Hella U" (feat. Medusa)
 "Lost Change in E Minor"
 "Yadda Yadda"
 "Em A Double Dee" (feat. Mad Dogg)
 "Control Tower"
 "Lost Change in D Minor"

2003

will.i.am - Must B 21 
 "Take It" (featuring KRS-One)
 "Nah Mean" (featuring Phife)
 "B Boyz" (featuring MC Supernatural)
 "Here to Party" (featuring Flii, Planet Asia and Kron Don)
 "Bomb Bomb" (Interlude)
 "Bomb Bomb" (featuring MC Supernatural)
 "Swing by My Way" (featuring John Legend)
 "It's OK" (featuring Triple Seven and Dante Santiago)
 "Mash Out" (Interlude)
 "Mash Out" (featuring MC Lyte and Fergie)
 "Ride Ride" (featuring John Legend)
 "Sumthin' Special" (featuring Niu, Dante Santiago and Taboo)
 "Sumthin' Special" (Interlude)
 "I'm Ready (Y'All Aint Ready for This)" (featuring Tash and MC Supernatural)
 "We Got Chu" (featuring Planet Asia & Flii)
 "Go!" (Interlude)
 "Go!"

The Black Eyed Peas - Elephunk 
 "Hands Up"
 "Labor Day (It's a Holiday)"
 "Let's Get Retarded"
 "Hey Mama"
 "Shut Up"
 "Smells Like Funk"
 "Latin Girls" (feat. Debi Nova)
 "Sexy"
 "Fly Away"
 "The Boogie That Be"
 "The Apl Song"
 "Anxiety" (feat. Papa Roach)
 "Where Is the Love?"

2004

Carlos Santana - All That I Am 
 "I Am Somebody" (feat. will.i.am)

John Legend - Get Lifted 
 "She Don't Have to Know"
 "Ordinary People"

Juanes - Mi Sangre 
 "La paga" (feat. Taboo)

2005

The Black Eyed Peas - Monkey Business 
 "Pump It"
 "Don't Phunk with My Heart"
 "Don't Lie"
 "My Humps"
 "Like That" (feat. Q-Tip, Talib Kweli, Cee-Lo and John Legend)
 "Dum Diddly" (feat. Dante Santiago)
 "Gone Going" (feat. Jack Johnson)
 "They Don't Want Music" (feat. James Brown)
 "Bebot"
 "Audio Delite at Low Fidelity"
 "Union" (feat. Sting)

Pussycat Dolls - PCD 
 "Beep" (feat. will.i.am)

Hitch Original Soundtrack 
 "Don't You Worry Bout a Thing" (John Legend feat. will.i.am)

Mary J. Blige - The Breakthrough 
 "About You" (feat. Nina Simone and will.i.am)

Shaggy - Clothes Drop 
 "Shut Up & Dance" (feat. Fergie and will.i.am)

Ricky Martin - Life 
 "It's Alright"
 "Drop It on Me" (feat. Daddy Yankee and Taboo)

Sarah McLachlan - Bloom: Remix Album 
 "Just Like Me (will.i.am Mix)" (feat. DMC)

Earth, Wind & Fire - Illumination 
 "Lovely People" (feat. will.i.am)

2006

Sérgio Mendes - Timeless 
 "Mas Que Nada" (feat. The Black Eyed Peas)
 "That Heat" (feat. Erykah Badu and will.i.am)
 "The Frog" (feat. Q-Tip and will.i.am)
 "Let Me" (feat. Jill Scott and will.i.am)
 "Surfboard" (feat. will.i.am)
 "Loose Ends" (feat. Justin Timberlake, Pharoahe Monch and will.i.am)
 "Yes, Yes Y'All" (feat. Black Thought, Chali 2na, Debi Nova and will.i.am)

Busta Rhymes - The Big Bang 
 "I Love My Bitch" (feat. Kelis and will.i.am)

Justin Timberlake - FutureSex/LoveSounds 
 "Damn Girl" (feat. will.i.am)
 "Pose" (feat. Snoop Dogg)
 "Boutique in Heaven"

Too Short - Blow The Whistle 
 "Keep Bouncin'" (feat. Snoop Dogg and will.i.am)

Fergie - The Dutchess 
 "Fergalicious" (feat. will.i.am)
 "Clumsy"
 "All That I Got (The Make Up Song)" (feat. will.i.am)
 "Voodoo Doll"
 "Here I Come" (feat. will.i.am)
 "Velvet"
 "Big Girls Don't Cry"
 "Mary Jane Shoes"

Kelis - Kelis Was Here 
 "What's That Right There?" (feat. will.i.am)
 "Till the Wheels Fall Off"
 "Weekend" (feat. will.i.am)
 "Fuck Them Bitches"

Diddy - Press Play 
 "Special Feeling"
 "All Night Long" (feat. Fergie)

John Legend - Once Again 
 "Save Room"
 "Each Day Gets Better"
 "Slow Dance"
 "Coming Home"

The Game - Doctor's Advocate 
 "Compton" (feat. will.i.am)
 ""I'm Chillin'" (feat. Fergie and will.i.am)

Ciara - Ciara: The Evolution 
 "Do It" (feat. will.i.am)
 "Get In, Fit In"

Nas - Hip Hop Is Dead 
 "Hip Hop Is Dead" (feat. will.i.am)
 "Who Killed It?"
 "Can't Forget About You"

2007

Freedom Writers Original Soundtrack 
 "A Dream" (Common feat. will.i.am)
 "Colors" (will.i.am)
 "Bus Ride" (will.i.am)
 "Riots" (Mark Isham feat. Miri Ben-Ari and will.i.am)

Bone Thugs-n-Harmony - Strength & Loyalty 
 "Streets" (feat. The Game and will.i.am)

Macy Gray - Big 
 "Finally Made Me Happy"
 "Okay"
 "Glad You're Here" (feat. Fergie)
 "Ghetto Love"
 "One for Me"
 "Strange Behaviour"
 "Get Out"
 "Treat Me Like Your Money" (feat. will.i.am)
 "Everybody"

Daddy Yankee - El Cartel: The Big Boss 
 "Who's Your Daddy?"
 "Plane to PR" (feat. will.i.am)

Common - Finding Forever 
 "I Want You" (feat. will.i.am)

Talib Kweli - Eardrum 
 "Hot Thing" (feat. will.i.am)
 "Say Something"

Chris Brown - Exclusive 
 "Picture Perfect" (feat. will.i.am)

LA Symphony - Unleashed 
 "Idle Times"

will.i.am - Songs About Girls 
 "Over"
 "Heartbreaker"
 "I Got It from My Mama"
 "Get Your Money"
 "Impatient"
 "Invisible"
 "Fantastic"
 "Fly Girl"
 "Dynamite Interlude"
 "Make It Funky"
 "S.O.S (Mother Nature)"

2008

Michael Jackson - Thriller 25 
 "The Girl Is Mine 2008" (feat. will.i.am)
 "P.Y.T. (Pretty Young Thing) 2008" (feat. will.i.am)
 "Beat It 2008" (feat. Fergie)

Flo Rida - Mail on Sunday 
 "In the Ayer" (feat. will.i.am)

Estelle - Shine 
 "Wait a Minute (Just a Touch)" (feat. will.i.am)
 "American Boy" (feat. Kanye West)

Mariah Carey - E=MC²
 "Heat"

Usher - Here I Stand 
 "What's Your Name?" (feat. will.i.am)

SMAP - Super Modern Artistic Performance 
 "Theme of 019" (feat. will.i.am)
 "Here Is Your Hit"

John Legend - Evolver 
 "Cross the Line"
 "Satisfaction"
 "I Love, You Love"

Sérgio Mendes - Encanto 
 "The Look of Love" (feat. Fergie)
 "Funky Bahia" (feat. will.i.am and Siedah Garrett)
 "Água De Beber" (feat. will.i.am)

Pussycat Dolls - Doll Domination 
 "Baby Love"

2009

U2 - No Line on the Horizon 
 "I'll Go Crazy If I Don't Go Crazy Tonight"

Flo Rida - R.O.O.T.S. 
 "Available" (feat. Akon and will.i.am)

The Black Eyed Peas - The E.N.D. 
 "Boom Boom Pow"
 "Rock That Body"
 "Meet Me Halfway"
 "Imma Be"
 "Alive"
 "Missing You"
 "Party All the Time"
 "Out of My Head"
 "Electric City"
 "Now Generation"
 "One Tribe"
 "Rockin to the Beat"

Cheryl Cole - 3 Words 
 "3 Words (song)" (feat. will.i.am)
 "Heaven" (feat. will.i.am)
 "Make Me Cry"
 "Boy Like You" (feat. will.i.am)
 "Heartbreaker"

Rihanna - Rated R 
 "Photographs" (feat. will.i.am)

Mary J. Blige - Stronger with Each Tear 
 "I Can't Wait" (feat. will.i.am)

2010

Kelis - Flesh Tone 
 "Brave"

Usher - Raymond v. Raymond 
 "OMG" (feat. will.i.am)

Nicki Minaj - Pink Friday 
 "Check It Out" (feat. will.i.am)

Cheryl Cole - Messy Little Raindrops 
 "Live Tonight"
 "Let's Get Down" (feat. will.i.am)

The Black Eyed Peas - The Beginning 
 "The Time (Dirty Bit)"
 "Light Up the Night"
 "Love You Long Time"
 "XOXOXO"
 "Someday"
 "Whenever"
 "Fashion Beats"
 "Don't Stop the Party"
 "The Best One Yet (The Boy)" (feat. David Guetta)
 "Just Can't Get Enough"
 "The Coming"
 "Own It"
 "Phenomenon"
 "Take It Off"

2011

Britney Spears - Femme Fatale 
 "Big Fat Bass" (feat. will.i.am)

2012

Usher - Looking 4 Myself 
 "Can't Stop Won't Stop"

Cheryl Cole - A Million Lights 
 "Craziest Things" (feat. will.i.am)

Rita Ora - Ora 
 "Fall in Love" (feat. will.i.am)

K'naan - Country, God, or the Girl 
 "Alone" (feat. will.i.am)

Priyanka Chopra - In My City 
 "In My City" (feat. will.i.am)

Kesha - Warrior 
 "Crazy Kids"

2013

will.i.am - #willpower 
 "Good Morning"
 "Hello"
 "This Is Love" (feat. Eva Simons)
 "Scream & Shout" (feat. Britney Spears)
 "Gettin' Dumb" (feat. apl.de.ap and 2NE1)
 "Geekin'"
 "Freshy" (feat. Juicy J)
 "#thatPower" (feat. Justin Bieber)
 "Great Times Are Coming"
 "The World Is Crazy" (feat. Dante Santiago)
 "Love Bullets" (feat. Skylar Grey)
 "Far Away from Home" (feat. Nicole Scherzinger)
 "Reach for the Stars"
 "Smile Mona Lisa"
 "Bang Bang"

The Great Gatsby: Music from Baz Luhrmann's Film 
 "Bang Bang" (will.i.am)

Dizzee Rascal - The Fifth 
 "Something Really Bad" (feat. will.i.am)

Miley Cyrus - Bangerz 
 "Do My Thang"

Britney Spears - Britney Jean 
 "Work Bitch"
 "Perfume"
 "It Should Be Easy" (featuring will.i.am)
 "Body Ache"
 "Til It's Gone"
 "Chillin' with You" (featuring Jamie Lynn)
 "Don't Cry"
 "Now That I Found You"

Lady Gaga - ARTPOP 
 "Fashion!"

2014

will.i.am - Birthday 
 "Birthday" (feat. Cody Wise)

Anja Nissen - I'm So Excited 
 "I'm So Excited" (feat. will.i.am and Cody Wise)

Nicki Minaj - The Pinkprint 
 "Grand Piano"

2015

The Game - The Documentary 2 
 "Don't Trip" (featuring Dr. Dre, Ice Cube, & will.i.am)
 "LA" (featuring Snoop Dogg, Fergie, & will.i.am)
 "The Ghetto" (featuring Nas & will.i.am)

PSY - 칠집싸이다 
 "Daddy" (featuring CL of 2NE1)
 "ROCKnROLLbaby" (featuring will.i.am)

2016

will.i.am - N/A 
00. "Boys & Girls" (featuring Pia Mia)

2018

Black Eyed Peas - Masters of the Sun Vol. 1 
 "Back 2 Hiphop" (Nas)
 "Yes or No"
 "Get Ready"
 "4ever" (Esthero)
 "Constant pt.1 pt.2" (Slick Rick)
 "Dopeness" (CL)
 "All Around the World"
 "New Wave"
 "Vibrations pt.1 pt.2"
 "Wings"
 "Ring the Alarm pt.1 pt.2 pt.3"
 "Big Love"

LGP Qua - Voice of the Youth Vol. 1 
00. "INSOMNIAC (woke)" (featuring will.i.am)

Produced singles from will.i.am 

 1998: "Fallin' Up/¿Que Dices?"  (The Black Eyed Peas)
 1998: "Joints & Jam"  (The Black Eyed Peas)
 1998: "Karma"  (The Black Eyed Peas)
 2000: "BEP Empire/Get Original"  (The Black Eyed Peas)
 2000: "Weekends"  (The Black Eyed Peas)
 2001: "Request + Line"  (The Black Eyed Peas featuring Macy Gray)
 2003: "Where Is the Love?"  (The Black Eyed Peas) 
 2003: "Shut Up"  (The Black Eyed Peas)
 2004: "Hey Mama"  (The Black Eyed Peas)
 2004: "Let's Get It Started"  (The Black Eyed Peas)
 2004: "Ordinary People" (John Legend)
 2005: "Don't Phunk with My Heart"  (The Black Eyed Peas)
 2005: "Don't Lie"  (The Black Eyed Peas)
 2005: "My Humps"  (The Black Eyed Peas)
 2005: "Pump It"  (The Black Eyed Peas)
 2006: "Beep" (Pussycat Dolls featuring will.i.am)
 2006: "Play with Fire" (Hilary Duff) 
 2006: "I Love My Chick" (Busta Rhymes featuring Kelis & will.i.am)
 2006: "Fergalicious" (Fergie featuring will.i.am)
 2006: "Mas Que Nada"  (Sérgio Mendes featuring The Black Eyed Peas)
 2006: "Hip Hop Is Dead" (Nas featuring will.i.am)
 2006: "Save Room" (John Legend)
 2007: "Can't Forget About You" (Nas featuring Chrisette Michelle)
 2007: "A Dream" (Common featuring will.i.am)
 2007: "Big Girls Don't Cry" (Fergie)
 2007: "I Got It from My Mama"
 2007: "Baby Love" (Nicole Scherzinger featuring will.i.am)
 2007: "Hot Thing" (Talib Kweli featuring will.i.am)
 2007: "Wait a Minute (Just a Touch)" (Estelle featuring will.i.am)
 2007: "I Want You" (Common featuring will.i.am)
 2008: "American Boy" (Estelle featuring Kanye West)
 2008: "In the Ayer" (Flo Rida featuring will.i.am)
 2008: "What's Your Name" (Usher featuring will.i.am)
 2009: "I Need a Dance" (Samman with David Guetta & will.i.am featuring Paris)
 2009: "Boom Boom Pow"  (The Black Eyed Peas)
 2009: "Meet Me Halfway"  (The Black Eyed Peas)
 2009: "3 Words" (Cheryl Cole featuring will.i.am)
 2010: "Imma Be"  (The Black Eyed Peas)
 2010: "Rock That Body"  (The Black Eyed Peas)
 2010: "OMG" (Usher featuring will.i.am)
 2010: "Check It Out"  (Nicki Minaj featuring will.i.am)
 2010: "The Time (The Dirty Bit)"  (The Black Eyed Peas)
 2011: "Just Can't Get Enough"  (The Black Eyed Peas)
 2011: "Don't Stop the Party" (The Black Eyed Peas)
 2011: "Forever" (will.i.am featuring Wolfgang Gartner)
 2012: "T.H.E. (The Hardest Ever)" (will.i.am featuring Jennifer Lopez & Mick Jagger)
 2012: "This Is Love" (will.i.am featuring Eva Simons)
 2012: "Scream & Shout" (will.i.am featuring Britney Spears)
 2013: "Take The World On" (2NE1)
 2013: "#thatPOWER" (will.i.am featuring Justin Bieber)
 2013: "Bang Bang" (will.i.am)

Discographies of American artists

Production discographies
Hip hop discographies